The Human Systems Integration Division are offices and laboratories within  the National Aeronautics and Space Administration,whose function is focused within investigation to application of new scientific knowledge relevant to human centred functioning in order to benefit  the objectives of the NASA space programme.The division seeks to advance human-centered design and operations of complex aerospace systems from experimentation relevant to   human performance and human-automation interaction, to make  improvements in the safety, efficiency and probability of  success of  missions.

Objectives
The strategic goals of the division are:

(i) the creation of a newly developed  base of understanding  concerning the elements involved primarily in human-machine system operation and interaction

"To advance our fundamental understanding of how people process information, make decisions and collaborate with human and machine systems."

(ii) the generation of  solutions to aviation safety problems, and improvement in performance.    

"To enhance aviation safety and performance by designing human-centered automation and interfaces, decision support tools, training, and team and organizational practices. "

(iii)   to increase  capabilities to further human presence in space.

"To extend human capabilities in space by advancing our knowledge of human performance during space missions and developing tools, technologies and countermeasures for safe and effective space operations."

Organization
The Division is comprised (May 16, 2011 information) of  the following groupings:
 [Advanced Controls and Displays]+ [Airspace Operations Laboratory (AOL)]+ [Ames Flight Deck Display Research Group]+ [Automation Interaction Design and Evaluation Group]+[Aviation Safety Reporting System (ASRS)]+[Aviation Training Research Lab]
 [Cognition Lab]+ [Cognitive Performance in Aviation Operations and Training]
 [Distributed Team Decision Making]
 [Emergency and Abnormal Situations Study]
 [Flight Cognition]
 [Human-Centered Systems Lab (HCSL)] + [Human-Computer Interaction Group (HCI)]
 [Integrated Safety Data for Strategic Response (ISDSR) Group]+ [Intelligent Spacecraft Interface Systems (ISIS)]
 [Man Machine Integration Design and Analysis (MIDAS)]
 [Operational Based Vision Assessment]
 [Professional Pilot Training Lab]+ [Psychophysiological Research Facility]
 [Spatial Auditory Display Laboratory]
 [TH Division]
 [Vision Science and Technology]+ [Visuomotor Control]

History
 (1960's)  [Human rated five degrees of freedom simulator] 
 (1970's) [Aviation safety report]
 (1980s) [Crew resource management and line-orientated flight training], [Human requirements for extended spaceflight]
 (1990's) [Automation design],[System monitoring and System sharing]
 (2000's) [Human factors for constellation]

See also
 for (five degrees of freedom simulator) goto Flight simulator : Manufacturers
 Controlled Impact Demonstration
 Decision making
 Decision analysis
 Decision support system
 Decision theory
 Decision tree
 Effect of spaceflight on the human body
 Human-machine interaction 
 Human machine interface
 Human-machine system
 Human spaceflight 
 Motion simulator
 National Advisory Committee for Aeronautics

Sources 

National Aeronautics and Space Administration:Human Systems Integration Division-History  (Curator: Phil So)  retrieved 10:40(UTC) 24.10.2011

NASA